Autódromo Roberto José Mouras is a motorsports circuit located in La Plata, Argentina. It has hosted events in the Turismo Carretera series. The inaugural race was on October 20, 1996 with a Turismo Carretera race, which was won by Emilio Satriano.

Events

 Current
 February: TC Mouras, TC Pick Up, TC Pista Mouras, TC Pista Pick Up
 March: TC Mouras, TC Pick Up, TC Pista Mouras, TC Pista Pick Up
 April: TC Mouras, TC Pista Mouras
 May: TC Mouras, TC Pick Up, TC Pista Mouras
 June: TC Mouras, TC Pick Up, TC Pista Mouras
 July: TC Mouras, TC Pista Mouras
 August: TC Mouras, TC Pista Mouras
 September: TC Mouras, TC Pista Mouras
 November: TC Mouras, TC Pick Up, TC Pista Mouras

 Former
 South American Super Touring Car Championship (1999)
 TC2000 Championship (1996, 2011)
 Top Race V6 (2001, 2003–2010, 2017–2019)
 Turismo Carretera (1996–2012, 2014–2017, 2020–2021)
 Turismo Nacional (1997–1999, 2003–2018, 2020–2021)

Lap records 

The fastest official race lap records at the Autódromo Roberto José Mouras are listed as:

References

Autódromo Roberto Mouras